Gavazzeni is a surname. Notable people with the surname include:

Gianandrea Gavazzeni (1909–1996), Italian pianist, conductor, composer, and musicologist
Giovanni Gavazzeni (1841–1907), Italian painter 

Italian-language surnames